Tikei, also known as Manu, Tikai and Tiku is an island in the Tuamotu group in French Polynesia. Tikei is not a typical Tuamotu atoll, but a separate island.

Geographically Tikei is part of the King George Islands (Îles du Roi Georges) subgroup, which includes Ahe, Manihi, Takapoto, Takaroa and Tikei.

Tikei is uninhabited. There used to be human habitation and the main village was called Tereporepo. The closest land is Takapoto Atoll, located 73 km to the Northwest. Tikei Island has been poorly researched.

History
The first recorded European to arrive to Tikei was Dutch mariner Jacob Roggeveen on May 18, 1722. He named this island "Carlshoff".

Russian mariner Otto von Kotzebue came to Tikei in 1816. He named it "Romanzov", after the main sponsor of his expedition.

Administration
Tikei belongs to the commune of Takaroa, which consists of the island of Takaroa, the island of Tikei and the atoll of Takapoto.

See also

 Desert island
 List of islands

References

 & Descriptions of the Island

External links
Atoll list (in French)

Islands of the Tuamotus
Uninhabited islands of French Polynesia